Cycling was held at the 2015 Parapan American Games between the 9–10 August at the Ontario Place West Channel in Toronto.

Schedule

8 August

10 August

11 August

13 August

Medal Standings

Road

Medal table

Medalists

Track

Medal table

Medalists

References

 Events at the 2015 Parapan American Games
Parapan American Games
Parapan American Games